First Lady or First Gentleman of Lithuania is the title attributed to the spouse of the president of Lithuania. The current first lady of Lithuania is Diana Nepaitė, wife of President Gitanas Nausėda. To date, there has been no official first gentleman of Lithuania. The country's first female president, Dalia Grybauskaitė, who held the office from 2009 to 2019, was unmarried during her presidency.

List of first ladies of Lithuania

References

Presidents of Lithuania
Lithuania